Homesick may refer to:

Homesickness, longing to return home

Entertainment

Albums
 Homesick (A Day to Remember album), 2009, or the title track
 Homesick (Deacon Blue album), 2001
 Homesick (Chris Price album)
 Homesick (Sea Girls album), 2022
 Homesick, a 2015 album by Matrixxman
 Homesick (EP), a 2018 EP by Trevor Daniel

Songs
 "Homesick" (Brutal Truth song), from their 1996 album Kill Trend Suicide
 "Homesick" (Catfish and the Bottlemen song), from their 2014 album, The Balcony
 Homesick (The Cheetah Girls song)
 "Homesick" (The Cure song), from their 1989 album Disintegration
 "Homesick" (Dua Lipa song), 2017
 "Homesick" (MercyMe song), on Undone
 "Homesick" (Pennywise song), from their 1993 album Unknown Road
 "Homesick" (Soul Asylum song), from their 1992 album Grave Dancers Union
 "Homesick" (Stan Walker song), from his 2010 album From the Inside Out
 "Homesick" (Steven Seagal song), from his 2006 album Mojo Priest
 "Homesick" (Thirsty Merc song), 2008
 "Homesick" (Train song), from their 1998 album Train
 "Homesick" (The Vines song), from their 2002 album Highly Evolved
 "Homesickness" (Donovan song), from HMS Donovan
 "Homesick", a song by Irving Berlin
 "Homesick", a song by Kings of Convenience from their 2004 album Riot on an Empty Street
 Homesick (Kane Brown song), from his album Experiment

Television and film 
 Homesick (1928 film), a 1928 American comedy film directed by Henry Lehrman
 Home Sick, a 2007 horror film by Adam Wingard
 Homesick (2015 film), a 2015 Norwegian film
 "Homesick" (Only Fools and Horses), a 1983 episode of the BBC sitcom Only Fools and Horses
 "Homesick", a Season 11 episode of the American police procedural drama NCIS

Books
 Homesick: A Memoir (Sela Ward memoir), by actress Sela Ward
 Homesick: My Own Story (1982), by Jean Fritz